Women Over 50 Film Festival (WOFFF) is a festival founded in Brighton, UK, in 2015, to address age and gender imbalances faced by older women in the film industry. The festival screens films that have a woman over 50 in a key creative role (writer, producer, director), or are about a woman over 50.

History  
Women Over 50 Film Festival (WOFFF) is a Community Interest Company, established in 2015. The goal behind the organization is to redress not only the gender imbalance present in the film industry, but the even greater gap experienced by older women. The organization cites industry research indicating that out of 2000 films analyzed, women between the ages of 42 and 69 spoke only 20% of the dialog, while men of the same age range spoke about 40% – twice as much. This, in addition to the general gap indicated by the Directors UK organization, which reported that of over 2,500 films made from 2005 to 2014, only 13% were directed exclusively by women.

The festival aims are to:
 Showcase the work of older women on screen and behind the camera
 Create a film community centered around older women
 Help combat isolation and loneliness in older women

WOFFF declares itself inclusive and intersectional, and has grown steadily since its inception. In 2015, the prototype event was held, entitled "Short Hot Flush Film Festival". At this event, 27 international short films were screened, a panel event was conducted, and four prizes were awarded. By 2019, over 50 films were screened, including two features, and the number of attendees and accompanying events grew accordingly, to include workshops, panels, lectures and master classes. In 2020, due to restrictions put in place during COVID-19, WOFFF become a 5-day online festival, screening 58 short films, hosting 8 virtual filmmaker Q&A sessions and a lecture by Dr. Francesca Sobande of Cardiff University.

The WOFFF lecture 
WOFFF hosts an annual lecture concentrating on older women in film and tv. Academics invited to deliver lectures from English, Welsh and US universities and their lecture topics have included:

Awards 
Awards are granted in the following categories:
 Audience Choice Award
Best Animation
Best Documentary
Best Drama
 Best Experimental
 Best Short Script
 Best Student Film

The award-winning films then participate in the "WOFFF Best of the Fest" tour around the UK.

Past winners

See also 
 List of women's film festivals

References

External links 
 

Women's film festivals
Film festivals in England
Film festivals established in 2015